Lusks Mills is an unincorporated community in Sugar Creek Township, Parke County, in the U.S. state of Indiana.

History
A post office was established at Lusks Mills in 1837, and remained in operation until 1845. The community was named after the Lusk family of settlers.

Geography

References

Unincorporated communities in Indiana
Unincorporated communities in Parke County, Indiana